Domérat is a commune in the Allier department in central France. In 2016, the municipality had 8,819 inhabitants, down 2.3% compared to 2011.

Population

See also
Communes of the Allier department

References

Communes of Allier
Allier communes articles needing translation from French Wikipedia